Archery was contested from October 1 to October 6 at the 1990 Asian Games in Beijing, China. The competition included only recurve events and took place at the Beijing Shooting Range Field.

South Korea dominated the competition, winning all possible four gold medals.

Medalists

Medal table

References 
 New Straits Times, October 1–7, 1990

External links 
 Men's team medalists
 Women's team medalists

 
1990 Asian Games events
1990
Asian Games
1990 Asian Games